Stepan Yosypovych Smal-Stotsky was a Ukrainian linguist and academician, Slavist, cultural and political figure, member of the Union for the Liberation of Ukraine, and ambassador of the West Ukrainian People's Republic in Prague.

His doctorate on Slavic philology was accepted by Franz Miklosich at the University of Vienna in 1885.

Smal-Stotsky was the father of Roman Smal-Stocki and a grandfather of George S. N. Luckyj.

Works
 Ruthenian language grammar (Hramatyka Ruskoyi movy). Ed.3. Vienna, 1914 (together with Theodor Gartner)
 Nemoliv. Memoirs. "Piramida". Lviv, 2013.

Monographs
 Ruthenian orthography (Ruska pravopys). 1891-1893.
 Ruthenian grammar (Ruska hramatyka). 1893.
 Bukovynian Ruthenia (Rus). Cultural and Historical Overview (Bukovynska Rus. Kulturno-istorychnyi obrazok). 1897.

References

External links
 Smal-Stocky on Encyclopedia of Ukraine website
 Katchanovski, I., Kohut, Z. E., Nebesio, B. Y., Yurkevich, M. Historical Dictionary of Ukraine. Scarecrow Press. Lenham, Toronto, Plymouth (UK), 2013
 Livezeanu, I. Cultural Politics in Greater Romania: Regionalism, Nation Building & Ethnic Struggle, 1918–1930. Cornell University Press. Ithaca, 2000

1859 births
1938 deaths
People from Lviv Oblast
Ukrainian Austro-Hungarians
People from the Kingdom of Galicia and Lodomeria
Chernivtsi University alumni
University of Vienna alumni
Academic staff of Chernivtsi University
Academic staff of Ukrainian Free University
Slavists
Ukrainianists
Ukrainian philologists
Ukrainian diplomats
Full Members of the National Academy of Sciences of Ukraine
Burials at Rakowicki Cemetery
Linguists from Ukraine
Ruthenian-language writers
West Ukrainian People's Republic people
Commanders of the Order of Franz Joseph